Artesanías de Colombia, S.A. is a corporation, ascribed to the Ministry of Commerce, Industry, and Tourism of Colombia that promotes and contributes to the progress and development of traditional and modern Colombian handicrafts and their craftsmanship to improve the commercialization of such products internally and abroad as a brand of Colombian identity and culture.

See also
 Colombian handicrafts
 Proexport

References

Government agencies established in 1996
Ministry of Commerce, Industry and Tourism (Colombia)
Colombian handicrafts